Alan Judson Faller (March 4, 1929 – March 12, 2022) was an American meteorologist / oceanographer specializing in small oceanic and atmospheric circulation. He was the son of the Olympic runner Fred Faller.

Career

In 1949, Faller took a one-year sabbatical from his studies at MIT to spend a year in the arctic (at the Resolute Bay weather station) collecting atmospheric data with weather balloons. While there, he and an associate discovered a cairn on Griffith Island, marking what appeared to be a grave.

After returning to MIT and completing his Sc.D., Faller was a researcher at WHOI from 1954 to 1963. From 1963 to 1989 he was a professor at the University of Maryland in the Institute of Fluid Dynamics and Applied Mathematics. His research was critical in the understanding of Langmuir circulations. and two instabilities of Ekman boundary layers.

Selected writings
Some of Alan J. Faller's publications include:

Awards and honors
 John Simon Guggenheim Memorial Foundation Fellow, awarded in 1960 (Natural Sciences, Earth Science)
 Fellow of the American Physical Society, awarded in 1974
 Fellow of the American Meteorological Society
 Professor Emeritus, University of Maryland

References

1929 births
Living people
People from Roslindale
University of Maryland, College Park faculty
American meteorologists
Fellows of the American Meteorological Society
Fellows of the American Physical Society